Vasili Vitalyevich Pyanchenko (born 21 July 1991) is a Russian professional football player. He plays for FC Amkar Perm.

Club career
He made his Russian Football National League debut for FC Yenisey Krasnoyarsk on 16 July 2012 in a game against FC Ural Yekaterinburg. He played 2 seasons in the FNL with Yenisey.

External links
 
 
 

1991 births
Sportspeople from Krasnoyarsk
Living people
Russian people of Ukrainian descent
Russian footballers
Association football defenders
FC Yenisey Krasnoyarsk players
FC Sakhalin Yuzhno-Sakhalinsk players
FC Novokuznetsk players
FC Zenit-Izhevsk players
FC Sokol Saratov players
FC Akron Tolyatti players
FC Amkar Perm players
Russian First League players
Russian Second League players